Marinobacter bryozoorum is a marine, Gram-negative, aerobic and halophilic bacteria with type strain KMM 3840T (=50-11T =DSM 15401T).

References

Further reading
Decolorization and Biodegradation of Acid Yellow-25 by Marinobacter bryozoorum AY-17, R.S. and Prakash Thorat Shertate 2013, Bionano Frontier, Vol. 6, Issue 1, Pages 40–44.

External links
LPSN
Type strain of Marinobacter bryozoorum at BacDive -  the Bacterial Diversity Metadatabase

Alteromonadales
Bacteria described in 2005
Halophiles